The 2000 World Table Tennis Championships –  women's team (Corbillon Cup) was the 38th edition of the women's team championship.

China won the gold medal defeating Chinese Taipei in the final 3–1. Romania and South Korea won bronze medals.

Medalists

Final stage knockout phase

Quarter finals

Semifinals

Final

See also
List of World Table Tennis Championships medalists

References

-
2000 in women's table tennis